is an independent European rock music record label.

History
It was formed in 2004 by Matthias Müssig, Christoph Ortner-Bach and Deville Schober. The label, actively distributes physical records in Germany, France, the United Kingdom, Italy, Spain and Scandinavia. Digitally they're mostly active in Europe but also distribute some band's like Matenrou Opera, angela and TeddyLoid almost worldwide. Gan-Shin Records exclusively signs bands from Japan, though has recently signed Madmans Esprit, a German-Korean based band. The label currently distributes the music of over 60 bands and artists throughout Europe.

Bands overview 
12012
abingdon boys school
An Cafe
angela
D
D'espairsRay
Dir en grey (transferred in 2009 to sister label Okami Records from the main label)
Domoto Tsuyoshi
DuelJewel
Gackt
Girugamesh
heidi.
Hyde
Ic5
Kagerou
L'Arc-en-Ciel
LM.C
Madmans Esprit
Megamasso
Merry
Mix Speakers, Inc
Mucc
Nightmare
NoGoD
Rentrer en Soi
The Studs
Vidoll
XodiacK
Zoro

See also
 List of record labels

References

External links
Gan-Shin

German independent record labels
Record labels established in 2004
Rock record labels